Jonathan Alder High School is an NCA accredited public high school located in Plain City, Ohio. It is the only high school in the Jonathan Alder Local School District. The school, as well as the district, are named after Jonathan Alder, the first white settler in Madison County.

The current building was first occupied in the 2005–2006 school year.  The original Jonathan Alder High School was built at 6440 Kilbury-Huber Rd., and was turned into a Junior High School when the new building was built.

Athletics

 Baseball - 1998 State Champions, 2010 State Champions (Undefeated 34-0 Season), 2013 State Runner-up, 2014 State Runner-up
 Girls Basketball – 2006 State Champions
 Football - 2006 State Runner-up
 Bowling - 2018 DII Boys State Runner up, 2019 DII Boys State Runner up
 Softball - 2019 DII Girls State Champions, 2022 DII State Runner-Up
 Volleyball - 2015 State Runner-up

Notable alumni
Arnett Howard, Trumpet Player
Donnie Nickey, NFL player

References

External links
 Jonathan Alder School District

High schools in Madison County, Ohio
Public high schools in Ohio
1957 establishments in Ohio